Tiger Hill may refer to:
 Tiger Hill, Suzhou, People's Republic of China
 Tiger Hill, Suffolk, a wood in England
 Tiger Hill, Darjeeling, India
 Tiger Hill, Kargil, near the Kargil region of Indian-Kashmir
 Tiger Hill (horse), Thoroughbred racehorse
 Tiger Hill (ship), a vessel involved in Aliyah Bet, an illegal immigration of Jews to Palestine in 1939